LNFA 2 (initials of Liga Nacional de Fútbol Americano 2) was the name of the second most important american football league in Spain, behind LNFA, and Portugal´s most important at the time.

The league was run by the Spanish Association of American Football (Agrupación Española de Futbol Americano (AEFA) in Spanish language). 

It was established in 2004 and folded in 2009.

It was played under nine-man football rules.

History

Last season (2009)
11 teams divided into two conferences competed in the league's last season, in 2009.

Final play-offs

External links
Agrupación Española de Fútbol Americano
European Federation of American Football
International Federation of American Football

Liga Nacional de Fútbol Americano
American football in Portugal
Sports leagues established in 2003
2003 establishments in Portugal
2003 establishments in Spain
Sports leagues disestablished in 2009